The 2018 Travelers Curling Club Championship was held from November 19 to 24 at the Miramichi Curling Club in Miramichi, New Brunswick.

Men

Teams

Round robin standings
Final standings

Pool A

Pool B

Playoffs

Quarterfinals
Friday, November 23, 1:30pm

Semifinals
Friday, November 23, 6:30pm

Bronze medal game
Saturday, November 24, 10:00am

Final
Saturday, November 24, 10:00am

Women

Teams

Round robin standings
Final standings

Pool A

Pool B

Tiebreakers
 5-3 
 5-3

Playoffs

Quarterfinals
Friday, November 23, 1:30pm

Semifinals
Friday, November 23, 6:30pm

Bronze medal game
Saturday, November 24, 10:00am

Final
Saturday, November 24, 10:00am

References

External links

2018 in Canadian curling
Curling competitions in New Brunswick
Travelers Curling Club Championship
Sport in Miramichi, New Brunswick
Travelers Curling Club Championship
Canadian Curling Club Championships